Donna Jones is a British Conservative Party politician who is the Hampshire Police and Crime Commissioner.

Political career 
Jones was a councillor for Hilsea on Portsmouth City Council from 1 May 2008 to 6 May 2021. From June 2014 to June 2018, she was Leader of the council, taking over from Gerald Vernon-Jackson, a Liberal Democrat, when there was a change of political control. He returned to the job in 2018.

While she was leader of the Conservative administration at Portsmouth council, Jones advised Portsmouth F.C. as strategic stadium development consultant. The council also launched an energy company, Victory Energy, which entered into a £100,000 sponsorship deal with Portsmouth F.C. In 2020 Victory Energy was wound up with losses of £3.5 million, following attempts by the council to sell the company.

In the 2019 general election, while still serving as a councillor, Jones was the unsuccessful Conservative candidate in Portsmouth South. During the campaign, she received criticism from political opponents for flying in a plane over the constituency, with a banner attached stating “Vote Donna Jones - Get Brexit Done”, instead of attending a candidates’ hustings on climate change.

Jones remained as a councillor and as leader of the Conservative group in Portsmouth until the 2021 Portsmouth City Council election on 6 May, when she stood down. However, at the 2021 England and Wales police and crime commissioner elections on the same day, Jones was elected as Hampshire Police and Crime Commissioner for Hampshire and the Isle of Wight.

Electoral history

Police and Crimes Commissioner 

Donna Jones won every counting area in Hampshire, with the closest being the traditionally-Labour City of Southampton, where she won by 877 votes.

Parliamentary

Portsmouth City Council

References 

21st-century British politicians
21st-century British women politicians
Conservative Party police and crime commissioners
Police and crime commissioners in England
Conservative Party (UK) parliamentary candidates
Politicians from Portsmouth

Living people

Year of birth missing (living people)